John Boyce Taylor (August 12, 1879 – March 25, 1956) was the second-oldest of four baseball-playing brothers, the others being Charles, Benjamin, and James.  Taylor was a pitcher and played in professional pre-league and Negro league baseball from 1903 to 1925.

Taylor was given his baseball nickname, "Steel-Arm Johnnie," by a white sportswriter for the Charlotte Observer (a predominantly white paper during the time) wrote about Taylor's great speed,  when he pitched for Biddle University in Charlotte, North Carolina in 1898. In the summer of 1898, he played two months for the Greenwood, South Carolina Red Stockings, and finished the season with the Greenville, South Carolina team.

In 1899 and 1900, Taylor pitched for his home club in Anderson, South Carolina where he reportedly won 90 percent of his games.

During the spring months of 1899 and later in 1905, he coached the Biddle University team.

He pitched the 1903 season for the Birmingham Giants where he pitched from thirty to forty games per season. He also reportedly never lost over seven games per season while at Birmingham. All four brothers were on that team by 1908, and he beat Hall of Famer Joe Williams 1-0 in San Antonio, striking out the side with the bases loaded in the ninth inning.

In the Spring of 1908, Taylor coached the M. and I College team of Holly Springs, Mississippi, developing players like Cobb and Pinson, who both went on to become the battery for the Birmingham Giants.

Taylor pitched for the St. Paul Colored Gophers in 1909, helping them claim a share of the western championship that year, posting a combined record of 37-6 between Birmingham and St. Paul. He pitched for the Chicago Giants in 1910, the St. Louis Giants in 1911, the West Baden Sprudels in 1912, and the Chicago American Giants in 1913 before reuniting with his brothers in 1914 on the Indianapolis ABCs.

When the Negro Leagues started in 1920, Taylor managed the Peoria, Illinois Black Devils for half a season, joining the Indianapolis ABCs again on June 21, 1920. Then 40-year-old Taylor pitched at least 3 known games that year.

Taylor pitched professionally until 1925.

During his years of coaching college baseball, it was said he reportedly never used tobacco, and did not drink alcohol and often emphasized to his players the virtues of clean living and hard work.

Taylor laid in an unmarked grave for 51 years, until researchers with the Negro Leagues Baseball Grave Marker Project put a proper gravestone on his grave in 2007.

References

 The Indianapolis ABCs: History of a Premier Team in the Negro Leagues, by Paul Debono
 The Biographical Encyclopedia of the Negro Baseball Leagues, by Jim Riley

External links
 and Baseball-Reference Black Baseball stats and Seamheads

1879 births
Bacharach Giants players
Birmingham Giants players
Chicago American Giants players
Chicago Giants players
Hilldale Club players
Indianapolis ABCs players
Louisville White Sox (1914-1915) players
St. Louis Giants players
St. Paul Colored Gophers players
West Baden Sprudels players
1956 deaths
20th-century African-American people